The Scythe is the fourth studio album by Italian folk metal band Elvenking. The Scythe was released on September 14, 2007, through AFM Records in all European countries, and November 7 in the US by Candlelight Records.

This is the first concept album by Elvenking, with lyrics centered on the death of a beautiful woman along with themes of revenge and deceit.  This is also illustrated in the video to "The Divided Heart".

Track listing
All music by Aydan and Damnagoras except "The Open Breach" by Jarpen. All lyrics noted below.
"The Scythe" – 5:36 (Aydan)
"Lost Hill of Memories" – 4:58 (Aydan)
"Infection" – 5:05 (Damnagoras)
"Poison Tears" – 4:30 (Damnagoras)
"A Riddle of Stars" – 5:22 (Aydan)
"Romance & Wrath" – 8:14 (Damnagoras)
"The Divided Heart" – 4:39 (Damnagoras)
"Horns Ablaze" (Digipak version bonus track) - 4:21 (Aydan)
"Totentanz" – 2:28
"Death and the Suffering" – 5:11 (Damnagoras)
"Dominhate" – 8:57 (Aydan)
"The Open Breach" (Jarpen) (Japanese bonus track) - 4:55

The digipak version also includes the video for the song "The Divided Heart"

Personnel
Damnagoras – vocals
Aydan – guitars
Gorlan – bass
Zender – drums
Elyghen – violin, keyboards

Guest musicians
 Mike Wead – 1st solo on "The Scythe," 2nd solo on "A Riddle of Stars"
 Laura De Luca – female vocals on "Romance & Wrath" and "Dominhate"
 Jared Shackleford – narration
 Mauro Bortolani – piano
 Isabella Tuni – female voice on "Romance & Wrath"
 Laura De Luca, Pauline Tacey, Claudio Coassin, Aydan – backing vocals
 Claudio Coassin, Damna, Aydan and Jarpen – shouts

String quartet
Arrangement by Elyghen
Eleonora Steffan – violin
Valentina Mosca – violin
Elyghen – viola
Marco Balbinot – cello

References

2007 albums
Elvenking (band) albums
AFM Records albums